Alexander Antonovich Solodukha (Belorussian Аляксандр Антонавич Саладуха; Born January 18, 1959, in Kamenka, Sergiev Posad district, Moscow region.) - Belarusian singer.

1991 - Alexander starts his solo career, performing in a Band "Carousel."

Solodukha names Valery Leontiev and Stas Mikhaylov as singers who influenced him.

In 1995, Alexander Solodukha comes to Russia to record his first album, "Hello, some strangers' sweetheart." By the present moment, the performed has released 4 albums.

At the National Music Awards 2012 presented by the Ministry of Culture of the Republic of Belarus and the Capital TV channel, Solodukha was honored in the category of “Best Tour” as well as “Creativity of the Year” (together with participants of the project «Russian: Поющие города» from Minsk).

References

1959 births
20th-century Belarusian male singers
Living people
Belarusian physicians
21st-century Belarusian male singers